Cash and Company is an Australian television period adventure series, which screened on the Seven Network in Australia in 1976 and on ITV (including the London Weekend Television and Anglia regions) in the UK. The series was set during the Victorian gold rush of the 1850s. The original series consisted of 13 one-hour episodes, filmed in colour and on location in Emu Bottom Plans, Victoria. This was located near the crew lodgings location at Emu Bottom Station on the outskirts of Sunbury, Victoria. It was created by Russell Hagg and Patrick Edgeworth who met working at Crawford Productions. They said they were $5,000 short making the show - the balance was provided by Ron Casey.

Production began in July 1974 and the series premiered on the Seven Network in Brisbane on 17 April 1975, Sydney on 26 May 1975 and Melbourne on 29 May. The series was also shown at Sunday lunchtime in the United Kingdom by the London Weekend Television (LWT) Network, in advance of its airing in Australia. It was also screened at the Cannes Film Festival and sold to Sweden, the Netherlands, Yugoslavia, Ireland, Norway, Rhodesia and Nigeria. It was produced by Homestead Films, a TV production company set up by Patrick Edgeworth and Russell Hagg, who had worked together at Crawford Productions on Matlock Police. Edgeworth's brother is the musician Ron Edgeworth, who was married to Judith Durham of The Seekers.

The episodes dealt with the adventures of bushrangers Sam Cash (Serge Lazareff) and his partner Joe Brady (Gus Mercurio) and a helpful widow, Jessica Johnson (Penne Hackforth-Jones). Cash and Brady were fugitives, constantly absconding from the authorities, led by the corrupt police trooper Lieutenant Keogh (Bruce Kerr). Other regular and recurring characters included Jessica's father in law (John Frawley) and her servant, Annie (Anne Scott-Pendlebury). The series was shot almost entirely on location at Sunbury, Victoria, the same area where Mad Max (1979) was filmed.

(Patrick Edgeworth and Russell Haig have no idea where the following story came from. It is false. In fact, being so impressed with Gerard Kennedy's work on the last ep. of Cash, we told the Seven Network he was our choice to replace Lazareff. And they agreed.)

Lazareff decided to leave at the end of the first series, when a second series was still in the planning stages. His character was replaced by Ryler, a former bounty hunter, played by Gerard Kennedy, a former cast member of Division 4. The Ryler character had appeared in one episode of Cash & Co. and Kennedy was recruited to replace Lazareff after Seven told the Homestead Films that they would not buy a second series unless the popular Logie-winning actor was cast in the new series.

The series was renamed Tandarra as the character of Sam Cash was no longer featured, and the fugitives from justice story line was removed. The character of Keogh was also dropped, and the character of Annie (Jessica's maid, played by Anne Pendlebury) only appeared in one episode. The character of Sam Cash was not mentioned at all in Tandarra, and all flashback sequences from the first series removed any reference to him.

Although the series title is taken from history, the story, events and timeline are of no relation to real life Australian bushranger, Martin Cash, whose gang went by the name of Cash and Co. Umbrella Entertainment released the series on DVD Region Free on 2 April 2014.

References

External links
 
 Classic Australian Television website
 Watch Cash and Company opening and a first scene
 Umbrella Entertainment website listing

Australian drama television series
Television series set in the 1850s
Television shows set in Victoria (Australia)
Seven Network original programming
Television shows set in colonial Australia
1975 Australian television series debuts
1975 Australian television series endings
Australian Western (genre) films